Moneyglass is a hamlet and townland in County Antrim, Northern Ireland. Moneyglass is near Toome and Lough Beg. It had a population of 103 people (38 households) in the 2011 Census. (2001 Census: 90 people)

People 
Champion National Hunt jockey and 2010 BBC Sports Personality of the Year winner, Sir Tony McCoy, who was appointed an OBE in 2010 and was knighted in 2016, was born in Moneyglass. McCoy is known to be a fan of Moneyglass GAC.
Willie John McBride, rugby union player, capped for Ireland on 63 occasions, 12 as Captain, is a native of Moneyglass but now lives in Ballyclare.
Audrey Gallagher, Irish singer whose vocals feature on many dance tracks, namely John O'Callaghan's "Big Sky" and Armin van Buuren's "Hold on to Me". Gallagher also provided vocals for alternative metal band Scheer.

References 

The McCourts of Moneyglass
NI Take a Closer Look

Villages in County Antrim
Civil Parish of Duneane